"Tamagotchi (Tschoopapa...)", or "Tamagotchi (Tschoopapa...): The Official Tamagotchi Song!", was first released in Germany in September 1997 as the fifth single (which was not featured in the album). It was an exclusive cooperation between Sqeezer and the Saban Worldwide company. The Special Fan Edition of the Tamagotchi song was released in December 1997 to the European Market under EMI. The song was promoted through airplay on several radio stations, as well as a performance on the German VIVA television program Interaktiv in October 1997. The official video of Tamagotchi was filmed in London in the UK.

Track listing

 Germany CD-maxi
 "Tamagotchi (Tschoopapa...)" (Video/Radio Version) – 3:53
 "Tamagotchi (Tschoopapa...)" (Extended Mix) – 5:16
 "Tamagotchi (Tschoopapa...)" (Cyberpet Mix) – 4:58
 "Remember Summertime Baby" – 4:15

 Europe (Special Fan Edition) CD-maxi
 "Tamagotchi (Tschoopapa...)" (Radio/Video Version) – 3:53
 "Tamagotchi (Tschoopapa...)" (Christmas Tamagotchi) – 4:02
 "Tamagotchi (Tschoopapa...)" (Karaoke Version) – 3:52
Special edition Bonus videos
 "Multimedia Part"

Charts

Weekly charts

References

External links
 
 
 
 
 

1997 singles
1997 songs
Sqeezer songs
EMI Records singles
Song articles with missing songwriters
Songs written by David Jost